St. Alphonsus Catholic School (SACS) is a Catholic institution currently run by the Daughters of Our Lady of the Sacred Heart. It was run by the Benedictine sisters for 88 years.  Its campus is located at Lapu-Lapu City, Cebu, Philippines. It offers programs in the preparatory, elementary and secondary levels. The school is accredited by the PAASCU.

It is the first private school on the island of Mactan founded by the Redemptorist Fathers in 1916. Father Mathew O'Callaghan was considered to be its founder. Since 1921, SACS has been under the administration of the Missionary Benedictine Sisters even when the Parish was turned over by the Redemptorists to the Missionaries of the Sacred Heart (MSC) in 1921. In 1991, SACS celebrated its Diamond Jubilee. SACS celebrated its 90th foundation day in August 2005. In August 2016, the school celebrated its 100th year of foundation.

History
One of the great blessings God bestowed on Opon (Lapu-Lapu) was the establishment of Saint Alphonsus Catholic School (Lapu-Lapu City, Cebu) Inc. popularly known in the community as Saint Alphonsus Catholic School (SACS). Founded in 1916 by Rev. Fr. Mateo O' Callaghan, a Redemptorist Priest, who named it in honor of their founder, St. Alphonsus de Liguori, the school has been faithfully helping the inhabitants of the island. In 1916, the primary course was opened with 250 pupils and in 1918 the intermediate grades were added, thus completing the Elementary Department.

Desirous of spreading their educational apostolate over the island, the Redemptorists Fathers opened branch schools in the year 1920. They spread through Mactan, Agus, Babag, Sta. Rosa, Kalawisan, Basak and Pajo. Being mainly supported by parish funds, the schools managed to survive until the 1950s. Gradually, they were phased out due to the newly opened public schools.

In 1921, the Missionary Benedictine Sisters were called to administer Saint Alphonsus Catholic School (Lapu-Lapu City, Cebu) Inc. In 1929, the Redemptorist Priests turned over the parish to the Missionaries of the Sacred Heart (MSC) and the Benedictine Sisters continued in administering the school.

As early as 1922, the Secondary Department was opened for the first and second year students. Saint Alphonsus Catholic School (Lapu-Lapu City, Cebu) Inc. continued to operate until the outbreak of the Second World War. Because of this, the school was forced to close down. In 1946, however, SACS was reopened. In 1947, Year Three was added; in 1948, Year Four, and in 1949, SACS promoted its first batch of high school graduates.

In 1973 a night Secondary Course was offered to Year One and Two. It gradually moved up to five years and produced its first graduates in 1977. However, in 1988, it was phased out.

SACS which began with an initial school population of 250, has reached an enrolment of 3,706 (S.Y. 1998-1999) for both Elementary and High School. To meet the demands of the continued increase in enrollment, the school plant has been accordingly expanded. From a one-story building, the school has now maintained a complex of eight buildings.

In 1985, the school went through its preliminary survey accreditation. In May 1990, the High School Department was granted an initial accreditation by the Philippine Accrediting Association of Schools, Colleges and Universities (PAASCU).

In 1991, Saint Alphonsus Catholic School (Lapu-Lapu City, Cebu) Inc. celebrated another momentous event in her history: her diamond jubilee. This is a living manifestation that for 75 years the institution has persistently and unwaveringly committed herself to the program of empowering the young citizens of the community.

In April 2002, the Grade School was awarded certificate of accredited status for a period of three years, hence, making both departments accredited. In the year 2005, the Grade School Department was accredited Level II status by the PAASCU. Then on March 16, 2006, the school was granted the permission for recognition to operate a pre-elementary course.

In 2009, with the Benedictine Sisters deciding to focus on their own schools and considering other forms of ministry, the school went through the transition stage. The Congregation of the Daughters of Our Lady of the Sacred Heart (FDNSC) was invited to work with the Benedictine Sisters. The administration of the school was then under the two Religious Congregations. Sr. M. Reginalda Cortez, OSB acted as the Directress and Principal of the High School Department while the sisters from the Congregation of the Daughters of Our Lady of the Sacred Heart took on the other administrative roles.

Since 2010, the DOLSH Sisters have taken the responsibility to manage SACS in accordance with the policies and standards set by the Department of Education (DepEd) and the Philippine Accrediting Association of Schools, Colleges and Universities (PAASCU).
In 2015, the High School Department was granted Level II Re-Accredited status.

In 2016, SACS celebrated the most significant milestone in her history: her Centennial Jubilee. This is undoubtedly striking evidence that for 100 years the institution has perseveringly and steadfastly committed herself to provide quality Christian education for social transformation. More so the granting of PAASCU Level II Re-Accredited Status to the Grade School Department and Level III Re-Accredited Status to the High School Department has greatly confirmed the school’s thrust for academic excellence and character formation of the young Alphonsian in her care. In the same year, Senior High School was opened offering the General Academic Strand comprising four (4) sections with 164 students.
	
In 2017, the Grade School Department was awarded Level III Re-Accredited Status.
	
In 2018, SACS produced the first batch of Senior High School graduates. On June 5, 2018, the application for STEM and HUMSS offerings was approved by the Department of Education.

In 2022, SACS produced the first batch of Super Senior High School graduates. On June 8, 2022, the application for super STEM and super HUMMS offerings was approved by the Department of Education.

In keeping with the signs of the times, the school continuously evaluates its efforts and updates its master plan in order to make them more useful and relevant and to reflect the changes in the educational needs of the students and community as well.

References

Education in Lapu-Lapu City
Educational institutions established in 1916
Catholic elementary schools in the Philippines
1916 establishments in the Philippines